Discovery Park is a  park in Chula Vista, California used for youth sports, community events, parties, and other functions.

In 2018, the park was the center of a scandal involving an alleged middle school fight club, with students from nearby Bonita Vista Middle School reportedly organizing fights and uploading videos to Instagram.

The park's statue of Christopher Columbus was vandalized in February, 2019, with red paint splattered on it and graffiti. A bronze plaque previously attached to the statue had been stolen.

References

Parks in San Diego County, California
Chula Vista, California